Samuel Smith was the founder of Smiths Group, one of the United Kingdom's largest engineering businesses.

Career
Trained as a craftsman, Samuel Smith opened his first shop in Newington Causeway, in London, in 1851. His business expanded rapidly, as he gained a reputation for offering a fast and friendly service. This enabled him to open a second shop in 1871. He had a son, also named Samuel, who developed the business to manufacture clocks and dials for automobiles. Samuel Smith Snr. died in 1875.

References

1875 deaths
British company founders
British watchmakers (people)
Year of birth unknown